The Main Street Bridge carries Sellers Street across a portion of the Silver Smith Branch in New Blaine, Arkansas. Built in 1922, it is a closed-spandrel masonry arch bridge, built out of locally quarried stone. It is named "Main Street Bridge" because Sellers Street was known as Main Street at the time of its construction, and was the principal route from the railroad depot to New Blaine's commercial and industrial area.

The bridge was listed on the National Register of Historic Places in 2002.

See also
National Register of Historic Places listings in Logan County, Arkansas
List of bridges on the National Register of Historic Places in Arkansas

References

Road bridges on the National Register of Historic Places in Arkansas
National Register of Historic Places in Logan County, Arkansas
Bridges completed in 1922
Stone arch bridges in the United States
1922 establishments in Arkansas
Transportation in Logan County, Arkansas